Dariyav Khatik also known as Dariyav Singh Rajoura (1945/6 – 24 April 2021) was an Indian politician and former member of Jhajjar legislative assembly in 1991. He was a member of Bhartiya Janata Party.

References

1940s births
2021 deaths
Indian politicians
Members of the Haryana Legislative Assembly
Bharatiya Janata Party politicians from Haryana
People from Jhajjar district